Stathis Tavlaridis (born 25 January 1980) is a Greek former professional footballer who played as a centre-back. Tavlaridis has earned the nickname "Taureau" in France which means "The Bull" due to his aggressive style of play.

Club career

Iraklis and England (Arsenal, Portsmouth)
Tavlaridis was born in Serres. He started his career at Iraklis Thessaloniki and in 2001 was transferred to Arsenal at the age of 21 for £1m. He never fully broke into the first team, unable to displace Sol Campbell and Kolo Touré, and spent a period on loan to Portsmouth. Whilst at Portsmouth he contributed four appearances as they won the First Division Championship and promotion to the Premier League. He made eight appearances for Arsenal, all but one of them in the League Cup. He made his Premier League debut in 2002–03 season against Southampton, where Arsenal rested many of their players for the upcoming FA Cup Final, also against Southampton. In early 2004 he was sent on a loan deal for the remainder of that season to French club Lille OSC.

Lille
On 29 April 2004, Tavlaridis was transferred from Arsenal to Lille OSC on a four-year contract. In his spell with the club he continually created a great deal of interest and attention from several other teams. With regard to Tavlaridis's time at Lille, he has regularly featured within both Champions League and Ligue 1 games for Les Dogues.  Of such was the first leg of a Champions League tie against AEK at the Stade Pierre-Mauroy in October 2006, of which eventually finished 3–1 to the hosts.
All in all, Tavlaridis in 2011 described his spell with Lille as "the most beautiful page of his career".

Saint-Étienne
Despite being linked with a hosts of Ligue 1 clubs, notably Bordeaux, Marseille, and Monaco, Tavlaridis announced that he was signing with AS Saint-Étienne for €2.5m after agreeing to a three-year deal with the club. Tavlaridis was handed the number 4 shirt and quickly inserted into the first eleven forming partnerships with Moustapha Bayal Sall. Tavlaridis made his debut against his former club Lille and was applauded by the Lille home fans.

Tavlaridis got off to a great start for the 2007–08 season scoring his first goal with AS Saint-Étienne in a 2–1 victory over Sochaux the following week. Tavlaridis was contract in the summer of 2009 with AS Saint-Étienne and a number of Premier League clubs were at the time believed to be prepared to offer him a route back to England. With this being so, he was named as the club's permanent captain by manager Alain Perrin following the first league match of the 2009–10 Ligue 1 season, after having served as vice-captain the previous season. Tavlaridis was removed as captain shortly due to his long-term injury. This move saw his playing time reduced, where he played only six more matches in that season for Saint-Étienne. Tavlaridis in all made 69 appearances for the Ligue 1 team, scoring twice.

AEL
On 30 April 2010 AEL announced that an agreement had been reached with the 29-year-old centre-back who will join the club in the summer on a free transfer, when his contract with les Verts has been finally wound down. Nicknamed 'Taureau' in France because of his bullish style of play, the Greek was initially a success in Ligue 1 with Lille OSC and then AS Saint-Étienne, though he fell out of favour at the Stade Geoffroy-Guichard earlier this season under head coach Alain Perrin. When the former Olympique Lyonnais boss was axed, Tavlaridis had an immediate chance to impress under Christophe Galtier, though his red card against Olympique de Marseille 10 minutes into Galtier's first game in charge effectively ended his first team career with les Verts. Tavlaridis signed a four-year deal.

On 9 August 2011, however, Tavlaridis terminated his contract without following the team's relegation to the Football League.

OFI
On 24 August 2011, Tavlaridis signed a one-year contract for OFI, who then were newly promoted to the Greek Superleague. The ex-footballer and president of the club Nikos Machlas wanted to add to the roster a very experienced defender, who could also play the role of the defence leader. The annual salary was fixed to €150,000.
However, due to the club's financial difficulties and payment inconsistencies, he decided to leave the club on 24 April 2012, before the 2011–12 campaign for OFI was over.

Atromitos
On 2 June 2012, Tavlaridis agreed to sign for Atromitos Athens.

In February 2014, Tavlaridis agreed to extend his contract till June 2016.

Panathinaikos
In December 2014, Atromitos announced that Tavlaridis was transferred to Panathinaikos.
Tavlaridis was delighted to sign with Panathinaikos, the team which he supported since youth. On 11 January 2015 he scored his first goal in a match against Ergotelis. It was his second appearance with the team and the first in its home ground Leoforos. Tavlaridis with Panathinaikos also scored in the game with PAOK in Touba for playoffs brought the club to practically within one point from clinching a spot in next season's UEFA Champions League qualifiers.

Moreover, Tavlaridis has joined a star-studded array of international active and retired players for the 12th Annual Match Against Poverty which will take place on 20 April at the Geoffroy-Guichard Stadium in Saint-Etienne, France. He will play along Didier Drogba, Ronaldo and Zinedine Zidane all of them UNDP Goodwill Ambassadors, for a match against an AS St-Etienne All Stars team to help boost Ebola recovery efforts. On 30 December 2015, Tavlaridis verbally agreeing to renew his contract with the Greens until the summer of 2017 and within January he will put pen to paper, that eventually took place five days later.
On 19 June 2016, Tavlaridis is not considered among Andrea Stramaccioni's plans. Panathinaikos tried to offload him over the summer but the Greek defender did not manage to find a club to continue playing.

On 12 January 2017, Tavlaridis is another footballer (after Michael Essien, Rasmus Thelander, Jens Wemmer and Niklas Hult) in eight months to file an appeal against Panathinaikos for payments' delay. The Greek international in his appeal, he claims for an amount that covers his compensation during his career in the club. On 11 May 2017, the committee of the Greek Football Federation's financial disputes has given the football player the amount of €272,000.

Aris
On 2 February 2017, Aris announced the signing of experienced central defender, who was recently released from Panathinaikos, until the summer of 2018.

International career
Tavlaridis only managed to play twice for the Greece national football team in 2005 FIFA Confederations Cup, having fallen out of favor with coach Otto Rehhagel as well as Akis Zikos, Ieroklis Stoltidis, Grigoris Georgatos, Nikos Lyberopoulos and Vassilis Tsartas. After ten years and the amazing 2014-2015 season with Atromitos and Panathinaikos he was called up by Markarian for the games against Faroe Islands for the preliminary round of UEFA Euro 2016 and the friendly game against Poland. On 17 June 2015, in a friendly match against Poland, at the beginning of the second half, he wore the jersey of the Greek team after almost ten years, by replacing Sokratis Papastathopoulos.

Dispute with Panathinaikos
On 27 February 2018, the administration of financially struggling Panathinaikos managed to agree terms with veteran international central defender, Tavlaridis. The Greens will finally pay €80,000 to the 38-year-old former defender, who was a member of the historic Athens club between January 2015 and January 2017, and therefore avoid a possible 3-point deduction from the Hellenic Football Federation.

Honours
Lille
UEFA Intertoto Cup: 2004

Individual
Super League Greece Team of the Year: 2013–14, 2014–15

References

External links
Arsenal F.C. Profile
Guardian Profile
Soccerbase Profile & Stats
LFP Profile & Stats

1980 births
Living people
Greek footballers
Greece international footballers
Greece under-21 international footballers
2005 FIFA Confederations Cup players
Association football central defenders
Ligue 1 players
Iraklis Thessaloniki F.C. players
Arsenal F.C. players
Portsmouth F.C. players
Lille OSC players
AS Saint-Étienne players
OFI Crete F.C. players
Atromitos F.C. players
Panathinaikos F.C. players
Premier League players
Super League Greece players
Greek expatriate footballers
Expatriate footballers in England
Expatriate footballers in France
People from Kapetan Mitrousi
AEK F.C. non-playing staff
Footballers from Central Macedonia